The Pixian railway station is a railway station on the Chengdu–Dujiangyan Intercity Railway in Pidu District, Chengdu, Sichuan, China. About ten trains stop at the station daily.

See also
Chengdu–Dujiangyan Intercity Railway

References

Stations on the Chengdu–Dujiangyan Intercity Railway
Railway stations in Sichuan
Railway stations in China opened in 2010